Abingdon Road is a road in Oxford, England.

Abingdon Road may also refer to:

Abingdon Road (album), a 2010 album by Abingdon Boys School
Culham railway station, named "Abingdon Road" from 1844 to 1856

See also
Abingdon Road Halt railway station
Abingdon (disambiguation)